Emry Pere (born 8 September 1998) is a New Zealand professional rugby league footballer who plays as a  for the Burleigh Bears in the Queensland Cup.

He previously played for the North Queensland Cowboys in the National Rugby League.

Background
Born in Huntly, New Zealand, Pere is of Māori descent and played his junior rugby league for Taniwharau. At age 9, he moved to Australia, where he played junior rugby league for the Helensvale Hornets and attended Keebra Park State High School. He later attended The Southport School, where he played for their rugby union side. He was a member of the Gold Coast Titans development squads before signing with the North Queensland Cowboys.

Playing career
In 2014, Pere played for Gold Coast Green in the Cyril Connell Cup, moving up to their Mal Meninga Cup side in 2015. In 2016, he moved to Townsville, playing in the Townsville Blackhawks Mal Meninga Cup-winning side. Later that year, he made his debut for the North Queensland Cowboys under-20 side and was selected in the Queensland under-18 team. In 2017, he again played for the North Queensland Cowboys under-20 side and represented the Junior Kiwis.

In 2018, Pere joined North Queensland's NRL squad and spent the season playing for the Northern Pride in the Queensland Cup. In October 2018, he once again represented the Junior Kiwis. In 2019, he switched feeder clubs to the Mackay Cutters, playing 22 games for them that season.

2020
On 31 July, Pere re-signed with the North Queensland club until the end of the 2022 season. In Round 13 of the 2020 NRL season, Pere made his NRL debut for the North Queensland Cowboys against the Gold Coast. Pere played just one other NRL game in 2020, coming off the bench in a Round 19 loss to the Penrith Panthers.

Statistics

NRL
 Statistics are correct to the end of the 2020 season

References

External links
North Queensland Cowboys profile
NRL profile

1998 births
Living people
New Zealand rugby league players
North Queensland Cowboys players
Northern Pride RLFC players
Mackay Cutters players
Rugby league props
Rugby league players from Huntly, New Zealand